Madukkarai taluk is a taluk in Coimbatore district, Tamil Nadu, India. It was created by Government of Tamil Nadu in 2013. According to the 2011 Census, it had a population of 343,763.

References

Taluks of Coimbatore district